Trusted Solaris is a discontinued security-evaluated operating system based on Solaris by Sun Microsystems, featuring a mandatory access control model.

Features
 Accounting
 Role-Based Access Control
 Auditing
 Device allocation
 Mandatory access control (MAC) labeling

Certification
Trusted Solaris 8 is Common Criteria certified at Evaluation Assurance Level EAL4+ against the CAPP, RBACPP, and LSPP protection profiles. It is the basis for the DoDIIS Trusted Workstation program.

Solaris Trusted Extensions
Features that were previously only available in Trusted Solaris, such as fine-grained privileges, are now part of the standard Solaris release. In the Solaris 10 11/06 update a new component called Solaris Trusted Extensions was introduced, making it no longer necessary to have a different release with a modified kernel for labeled security environments. Solaris Trusted Extensions is an OpenSolaris project.

Solaris Trusted Extensions, when enabled, enforces a mandatory access control policy on all aspects of the operating system, including device access, file, networking, print and window management services. This is achieved by adding sensitivity labels to objects, thereby establishing explicit relationships between these objects. Only appropriate (and explicit) authorization allows applications and users read and/or write access to the objects.

The component also provides labeled security features in a desktop environment. Apart from extending support for the Common Desktop Environment from the Trusted Solaris 8 release, it delivered the first labeled environment based on GNOME. Solaris Trusted Extensions facilitates the access of data at multiple classification levels through a single desktop environment.

Solaris Trusted Extensions also implements labeled device access and labeled network communication, through the Commercial Internet Protocol Security Option (CIPSO) standard. CIPSO is used to pass security information within and between labeled zones. Solaris Trusted Extensions complies with the Federal Information Processing Standards (FIPS).

References

External links
 
 

Operating system security
Sun Microsystems software
Proprietary operating systems